Aminoacetaldehyde diethylacetal is the organic compound with the formula (EtO)2CHCH2NH2.  A colorless liquid, it is used as a surrogate for aminoacetaldehyde.

See also
 Aminoaldehydes and aminoketones

References

Amines
Acetals